Apaxco de Ocampo is a town and the municipal seat of the Apaxco municipality, Mexico State in Mexico. As of 2010, the town has a population of 13,836.

References

Apaxco
Populated places in the State of Mexico
Municipality seats in the State of Mexico
Nahua settlements
Otomi settlements
Populated places in the Teotlalpan